Dalila Jakupović (born 24 March 1991) is a Slovenian tennis player of Bosnian descent.

Jakupović to date has won two doubles titles on the WTA Tour along with two WTA Challenger doubles titles. She also has won five singles and ten doubles titles on the ITF Women's Circuit. In November 2018, she reached her career-high singles ranking of world No. 69. On 10 September 2018, she peaked at No. 38 in the doubles rankings.

Playing for the Slovenia Fed Cup team, Jakupović has a win–loss record of 8–9.

In January 2020, Jakupovic collapsed during the Australian Open as a result of the pollution following the bushfires in the country.

Performance timeline

Only main-draw results in WTA Tour, Grand Slam tournaments, Fed Cup/Billie Jean King Cup and Olympic Games are included in win–loss records.

Singles
Current through the 2022 Prague Open.

Doubles

WTA career finals

Doubles: 5 (2 titles, 3 runner–ups)

WTA Challenger finals

Singles: 1 (runner–up)

Doubles: 6 (2 titles, 4 runner–ups)

ITF Circuit finals

Singles: 17 (5 titles, 12 runner–ups)

Doubles: 25 (10 titles, 15 runner–ups)

Fed Cup/Billie Jean King Cup participation

Singles (5–2)

Doubles (1–3)

Notes

References

External links

 
 
 

1991 births
Living people
Sportspeople from Jesenice, Jesenice
Slovenian female tennis players
Slovenian people of Bosnia and Herzegovina descent